Hamel Township is located in Madison County, Illinois, in the United States. As of the 2010 census, its population was 2,526 and it contained 985 housing units.

Geography

Demographics

References

External links
City-data.com
Illinois State Archives

Townships in Madison County, Illinois
Townships in Illinois